William Henry Dunlevy McCormick (24 October 1916, Derry – 28 August 1996) was one of the founders of the modern Irish architectural movement and one of the most important church architects in Ulster. He was responsible for designing twenty-seven ecclesiastical buildings and numerous commercial and state buildings, including the iconic Met Éireann building in Glasnevin, Dublin. McCormick was an accomplished sailor and member of the Irish Cruising Club, for which he served as flag officer.

Life
McCormick was educated at St Columb's College, Derry, but later studied architecture in Liverpool (where he graduated in 1943). On his return to Northern Ireland he began working for the Derry Corporation and later for Ballymena Urban District Council. Whilst living in Derry, McCormick contracted tuberculosis and was sent to convalesce in Greencastle in Inishowen, County Donegal. In 1947, whilst convalescing, together with Frank Corr, McCormick successfully won a competition to design a new church for Ennistymon in County Clare.

Career  
In 1948, McCormick and Frank Corr formed an architectural studio called Corr and McCormick. The studio continued to exist until 1968, when McCormick then formed McCormick Tracey Mullarkey. McCormick continued to design churches until his retirement in 1982, after which he completed a number of private commissions, including the house near Greencastle of his close friend and Derry politician John Hume. During the 1970s, McCormick's architectural studio offices were firebombed, leading to the total destruction of his professional records.

Awards 
In 1999 McCormick's St Aengus' Church, Burt, County Donegal was voted Ireland's "Building of the 20th century" in a readers' poll organised by the Royal Institute of the Architects of Ireland and the Sunday Tribune, which featured windows from a stained glass artist he commissioned for 11 of his buildings, Helen Moloney. Additionally McCormick was awarded the RIAI Triennial Gold Medal.

Legacy 
McCormick was one of the founding members of the North West Architectural Association. He was also a member of the Ulster Architectural Heritage Society (UAHS), the Royal Society of Ulster Architects and the Royal Institute of Architects of Ireland. He was also a trustee of the Ulster Museum. In 1977, McCormick was awarded an honorary doctorate from Coleraine University. In 1984 he was made a Knight of St Gregory.

Notable buildings by region

County Donegal 
 Milford church (1961)
 Murlog church (1964)
 Desertegney church (1964)
 Burt church (1967)
 Creeslough church (1971)
 Glenties church (1974) 
 Donoughmore Presbyterian church (1977)

Dublin 
 Met Éireann Building, Glasnevin (1979)

Gallery

References

External links 
 Liam McCormick Architecture Ireland
 Liam McCormick
 North by Northwest – Irish Architectural Archive
 Profile
 Met Eireann | Dublin City Council
 Burt Church | | Irish Architecture Gallery

1916 births
1996 deaths
20th-century Irish architects
People educated at St Columb's College
People from Derry (city)